Kraków Fast Tram is a light rail network being developed in Kraków.

Unlike many light rail systems, Kraków Fast Tram is not separate from regular tramway lines: the tracks are a part of the wider "classic" tramway network and are used by ordinary trains, which benefit from moving through a fast tram corridor. The stops at the fast tram tracks are equipped with an electronic passenger information system showing estimated departure times live. As of 2017, the system is also installed on other, less modern tram lines.

History 

The first fast tram line was opened on 12 December 2008, more than 30 years since construction started; however due to the missing tracks through Płaszów, it temporarily used the link through Kazimierz and Podgórze districts, where short lengths of track were not in its own right-of-way but were connected to the traffic light control system and passenger information system. That gap was eliminated when the light rail overpass over the rail station in Płaszów opened on 30 August 2015. The construction costs amounted to 164 million złoty, of which 67 million was covered by EU funds. It incorporates a tram stop with stairways and elevators to the rail platforms underneath and can be used by both pedestrians and cyclists, in addition to trams and emergency vehicles.

Lines 

In addition to the ordinary lines, there are two "fast tram lines" that run at up to 5 minute intervals on the fast tram tracks:

See also
 Trams in Kraków

References

External links 
 MPK Kraków, tram network operator website 
 ZIKiT Kraków, the infrastructure owner website 
 Brochure on public transport in Kraków
 Map and application tracking Kraków trams live

Krakow
Transport in Kraków